Anapausa is a genus of longhorn beetles of the subfamily Lamiinae, containing the following species:

 Anapausa armata Thomson, 1864
 Anapausa longipennis Breuning, 1966
 Anapausa rugifrons Breuning, 1951

References

Homonoeini